is a retired Japanese sprinter. She competed in the 4 × 100 metres relay at the 1991 World Championships in Tokyo and the 4 × 400 meters relay at the 2001 World Championships in Edmonton. She is the first Japanese woman to run 200 metres in under 24 seconds and 400 metres in under 53 seconds, a former Japanese record holder for both events.

Personal bests

International competition

National Championships titles
She was a seven-time national champion at the Japanese Championships.

References

External links

Kazue Kakinuma at JAAF  (archived)
Kazue Kakinuma at Mizuno  (archived)

1974 births
Living people
Japanese female sprinters
Sportspeople from Saitama Prefecture
World Athletics Championships athletes for Japan
Athletes (track and field) at the 1994 Asian Games
Athletes (track and field) at the 2002 Asian Games
Asian Games medalists in athletics (track and field)
Asian Games bronze medalists for Japan
Medalists at the 1994 Asian Games
Competitors at the 1995 Summer Universiade
Japan Championships in Athletics winners
Chuo University alumni